Fröhlich is a German language surname meaning cheerful. Also spelled Froelich, Froehlich, Frohlich or Frolich, the surname may refer to:

 Abraham Emanuel Fröhlich, German evangelist, theologian and writer
 Adolf Froelich, Polish inventor, dentist and officer
 Albrecht Fröhlich, German Jewish mathematician
 Fröhlich Prize, prize of the London Mathematical Society, in memory of Albrecht Fröhlich
 Alfred Fröhlich, Austrian-American pharmacologist and neurologist
 Alfredo Frohlich, American businessman
 Danny Frolich, artist from New Orleans famous for designing Mardi Gras art
 Charlotta Frölich, Swedish historian and agronomist
 Edward Fröhlich Haskell, scientist and philosopher
 Eric Froehlich, American professional poker player
 Eva Margareta Frölich, Swedish-Latvian visionary writer
 Franz Anton Gottfried Frölich (1805–1878), German entomologist
 Gertrud Nüsken (born Fröhlich, 1917–1972), German chess master
 Gustav Fröhlich, German actor
 Harold E. Froehlich (1923–2007), American engineer who designed deep-diving exploratory submarine
 Harold Vernon Froehlich, U.S. congressman from Wisconsin, 1973–1975
 Herbert Fröhlich (1905–1991), German-born British physicist
 Jack Froehlich, American rocket scientist
 Froelich (crater), a crater on the moon named after Jack Froehlich
 Jean-Pierre Frohlich, New York City Ballet balletmaster and former soloist
 Johannes Frederik Fröhlich (1806–1860), Danish violinist, conductor and composer
 John Froelich, American inventor of the first gasoline-powered tractor
 Josef Aloys Frölich (1766–1841), German doctor, botanist and entomologist
 Jürg Martin Fröhlich, Swiss mathematician and theoretical physicist
 Katharina Fröhlich (1801–1879), German lover of the poet Franz Grillparzer
 Linda Fröhlich, German professional basketball player
 Paul Frölich, German politician
 Paul Froehlich, Illinois politician
 Péter Fröhlich, Hungarian fencing master and Olympic coach
 Peter Gay (born Peter Joachim Fröhlich), historian
 Samuel Heinrich Froehlich (1803–1857), evangelist
 , United States Navy minesweeper in commission from 1917 to 1919

See also 
 Adiposogenital dystrophy, also known as "Babinski-Fröhlich syndrome" or "Frölich's syndrome"
 Dunkelfelder, grape variety also known as "Farbtraube Froelich" or "Froelich V 4-4" after the grape breeder Gustav Adolf Froelich (1847–1912)
 Frölicher spectral sequence, a mathematical tool in the theory of complex manifolds
 Phyllis Frelich, American actress

Jewish surnames
German-language surnames
Surnames from nicknames